Breheimen National Park (Lit: Home of The Glaciers) is a national park that was established in 2009. The park is located in the municipalities of Skjåk and Lom in Innlandet county and in Luster in Vestland county, Norway.

The park is surrounded by three other national parks: Jostedalsbreen National Park, Jotunheimen National Park, and Reinheimen National Park.

The park includes the mountains Hestbreapiggan, Tverrådalskyrkja, and Holåtinden as well as the glaciers Harbardsbreen, Spørteggbreen, and Holåbreen.

Archeology
In the summer of 2011, a well-preserved man's coat was found that dates back to 300 A.D., making this coat the oldest coat in the country. The coat was found in bed of the melted glacier.

References

External links
 Map of Breheimen National Park

National parks of Norway
Protected areas established in 2009
Protected areas of Innlandet
Protected areas of Vestland
Tourist attractions in Innlandet
Tourist attractions in Vestland
2009 establishments in Norway